The Interim Batasang Pambansa (English: Interim National Assembly) was the legislature of the Republic of the Philippines from its inauguration on June 12, 1978, to June 5, 1984. It served as a transitional legislative body mandated by the 1973 Constitution as the Philippines shifted from a presidential to a semi-presidential form of government.

Sessions
 First Regular Session: June 12, 1978 – June 6, 1979
 Second Regular Session: July 23, 1979 – June 11, 1980
 Third Regular Session: July 28, 1980 – April 28, 1981
 Fourth Regular Session: July 27, 1981 – June 1, 1982
 Fifth Regular Session: July 26, 1982 – April 14, 1983
 Sixth Regular Session: July 25, 1983 – June 5, 1984

Leadership
 President/Prime Minister
Ferdinand E. Marcos (KBL)

 First Lady
Imelda R. Marcos (KBL, Minister of Human Settlements/Region IV-A)

 Prime Minister
Cesar E.A. Virata  (KBL, Minister of Finance/Region IV-B), elected June 30, 1981

 Deputy Prime Minister
Cesar E.A. Virata   (KBL, Minister of Finance/Region IV-B)
Jose A. Roño, Jr. (KBL, Region VIII), elected June 30, 1981

 Speaker of the Batasan
Querube C. Makalintal  (KBL, Region IV-A)

 Speaker Pro-Tempore
Datu Blah T. Sinsuat  (KBL, Region XII)

 Majority Floor Leader
Jose A. Roño, Jr.  (KBL, Region VIII)

 Minority Floor Leader
Hilario G. Davide, Jr.  (Pusyon Bisaya, Region VII)

Note:

Legislation
The Interim Batasang Pambansa passed a total of 702 laws.

Major legislation
 Batas Pambansa Blg. 1 — General Appropriations Act of 1978
 Batas Pambansa Blg. 2 — Repeal of Presidential Decree No. 31 and the Consolidation of Taxes of Hotels, Motels and Other Establishments
 Batas Pambansa Blg. 3 — National Internal Revenue Code Amendment
 Batas Pambansa Blg. 6 — Reduction of the Penalty for Illegal Possession of Bladed, Pointed or Blunt Weapons
 Batas Pambansa Blg. 8 — Definition and Implementation of the metric system and instituted the Modern Philippine Standard Time
 Batas Pambansa Blg. 22 — The Anti-Bouncing Check Law
Batas Pambansa Blg. 42 — Amending the PCSO Charter
 Batas Pambansa Blg. 54 — Setting the date of January 30, 1980 as the date for a plebiscite to ratify the 1976 Amendments to the 1973 Constitution of the Philippines
 Batas Pambansa Blg. 61 — General Banking Act
 Batas Pambansa Blg. 62 — Savings and Loan Association Act
 Batas Pambansa Blg. 63 — Private Development Banks Act
 Batas Pambansa Blg. 64 — Amending the DBP Charter
 Batas Pambansa Blg. 65 — Amending the Rural Banks Act
 Batas Pambansa Blg. 66 — Amending the Investment House Law
 Batas Pambansa Blg. 67 — Amending the Central Bank Act
 Batas Pambansa Blg. 68 — The Corporation Code
 Batas Pambansa Blg. 70 — Amending the Labor Code
 Batas Pambansa Blg. 71 — Amending the Revised Penal Code
 Batas Pambansa Blg. 72 — National Census Act of 1980
 Batas Pambansa Blg. 73 — Energy Conservation Act of 1980
 Batas Pambansa Blg. 74 — Amending the Land Transportation and Traffic Code
 Batas Pambansa Blg. 76 — Amending the Probation Law of 1976
 Batas Pambansa Blg. 79 — Creation of the Commission on Filipinos Overseas
 Batas Pambansa Blg. 122 — Setting the date of April 7, 1981 as the date for a plebiscite to ratify the 1981 Amendments to the 1973 Constitution of the Philippines
 Batas Pambansa Blg. 222 — Barangay Election Act of 1982

Members

President/Prime Minister

Cabinet Members

Regional Representatives
The members of the Interim Batasang Pambansa were elected per region, as specified in the 1978 Election Code, enacted on February 7, 1978.

 Resigned from office on September 16, 1983.

Sectoral Representatives
The sectoral members of the Interim Batasang Pambansa were elected at large on April 27, 1978.

References

External links
 Philippine Commission on Elections
 Philippine House of Representatives
 Philippine Senate
 The LAWPHiL Project – Philippine Laws and Jurispudance databank

Further reading
 Philippine Commission on Elections — Records and Statistics Division
 Philippine House of Representatives Congressional Library
  

Philippines
Batasang Pambansa
Presidency of Ferdinand Marcos